San Cristoforo sul Naviglio, or San Cristoforo for short, is a district ("quartiere") of Milan, Italy, part of the Zone 6 administrative division of the city. It is named after its most important monument, the Romanesque-Gothic church of San Cristoforo sul Naviglio. The district is located along the Naviglio Grande canal, south of Giambellino-Lorenteggio.

External links

Districts of Milan